Carex forficula, also known as scissors-like sedge and xi shui tai cao in pinyin in China, is a tussock-forming species of perennial sedge in the family Cyperaceae. It is native to Japan, Korea, and eastern parts of China and Russia.

The species was first formally described by the botanists Adrien René Franchet and Ludovic Savatier in 1878 as a part of the work Enumeratio Plantarum in Japonia Sponte Crescentium.

See also
List of Carex species

References

forficula
Taxa named by Adrien René Franchet
Taxa named by Ludovic Savatier
Plants described in 1878
Flora of Japan
Flora of China
Flora of Korea
Flora of Manchuria
Flora of Primorsky Krai